Sitakund Government Model High School is a secondary school in Sitakunda Upazila, Chittagong District, Bangladesh.

References 

Schools in Chittagong District
High schools in Bangladesh
Educational institutions established in 1913
1913 establishments in India